Armin Hofmann (HonRDI) (29 June 1920 – 18 December 2020) was a Swiss graphic designer. 

He began his career in 1947 as a teacher at the Allgemeine Gewerbeschule Basel School of Art and Crafts at the age of twenty-six. Hofmann followed Emil Ruder as head of the graphic design department at the Schule für Gestaltung Basel (Basel School of Design) and was instrumental in developing the graphic design style known as the Swiss Style. His teaching methods were unorthodox and broad based, setting new standards that became widely known in design education institutions throughout the world. His independent insights as an educator, married with his rich and innovative powers of visual expression, created a body of work enormously varied – books, exhibitions, stage sets, logotypes, symbols, typography, posters, sign systems, and environmental graphics. His work is recognized for its reliance on the fundamental elements of graphic form – point, line, and shape – while subtly conveying simplicity, complexity, representation, and abstraction. Originating in Russia, Germany and The Netherlands in the 1920s, stimulated by the artistic avant-garde and alongside the International Style in architecture. He is well known for his posters, which emphasized economical use of colour and fonts, in reaction to what Hofmann regarded as the "trivialization of colour."   His posters have been widely exhibited as works of art in major galleries, such as the New York Museum of Modern Art.

He was also an influential educator, retiring in 1987. In 1965 he wrote the Graphic Design Manual, a popular textbook in the field.

Hofmann died in December 2020 at the age of 100 in Lucerne, where he lived with his wife Dorothea Hofmann-Schmid.

References 

1920 births
2020 deaths
Logo designers
Men centenarians
Swiss centenarians
Swiss graphic designers
Swiss typographers and type designers

Listen to Mr. Morale & the Big Steppers

AIGA medalists